The 1988 Chicago White Sox season was the White Sox's 89th season. They finished with a record of 71–90, good enough for 5th place in the American League West, 32.5 games behind the 1st place Oakland Athletics.

Offseason 
 November 12, 1987: Richard Dotson and Scott Nielsen were traded by the White Sox to the New York Yankees for Dan Pasqua, Steve Rosenberg and Mark Salas.
 November 16, 1987: Jeff Schaefer was signed as a free agent by the White Sox.
 December 8, 1987: Rodney McCray was drafted by the White Sox from the San Diego Padres in the 1987 minor league draft.
 December 10, 1987: Floyd Bannister and Dave Cochrane were traded by the White Sox to the Kansas City Royals for Mélido Pérez, John Davis, Greg Hibbard and Chuck Mount (minors).
 February 9, 1988: José DeLeón was traded by the White Sox to the St. Louis Cardinals for Lance Johnson, Ricky Horton and cash.

Regular season 
 Twenty-six days and 21 losses after leaving spring training, the Baltimore Orioles finally got their first win of the season. The runs came in bunches and the pitching staff threw a shutout as the O's downed the Chicago White Sox, 9–0.

Season standings

Record vs. opponents

1988 Opening Day lineup 
 Lance Johnson, CF
 Ozzie Guillén, SS
 Harold Baines, DH
 Iván Calderón, RF
 Greg Walker, 1B
 Carlton Fisk, C
 Dan Pasqua, LF
 Kenny Williams, 3B
 Donnie Hill, 2B
 Ricky Horton, P

Notable transactions 
 June 1, 1988: Robin Ventura was drafted by the White Sox in the 1st round (10th pick) of the 1988 amateur draft. Player signed October 21, 1988.
 August 4, 1988: Mike Maksudian and Vince Harris (minors) were traded by the White Sox to the New York Mets for Tom McCarthy and Steve Springer.
 August 19, 1988: Gary Redus was traded by the White Sox to the Pittsburgh Pirates for Mike Diaz.
 August 30, 1988: Ricky Horton was traded by the White Sox to the Los Angeles Dodgers for Shawn Hillegas.
 September 25, 1988: Jim Morris was signed as a free agent by the White Sox.

Roster

Player stats

Batting 
Note: G = Games played; AB = At bats; R = Runs scored; H = Hits; 2B = Doubles; 3B = Triples; HR = Home runs; RBI = Runs batted in; BB = Base on balls; SO = Strikeouts; AVG = Batting average; SB = Stolen bases

Pitching 
Note: W = Wins; L = Losses; ERA = Earned run average; G = Games pitched; GS = Games started; SV = Saves; IP = Innings pitched; H = Hits allowed; R = Runs allowed; ER = Earned runs allowed; HR = Home runs allowed; BB = Walks allowed; K = Strikeouts

Farm system

References

External links 
 1988 Chicago White Sox at Baseball Reference

Chicago White Sox seasons
Chicago White Sox season
Chicago